Kalateh-ye Mazar (also Romanized as Kalāteh-ye Mazār and Kalāteh Mazār) is a village in Arabkhaneh Rural District, Shusef District, Nehbandan County, South Khorasan Province, Iran. At the 2006 census, its population was 69, in 19 families.

References 

Populated places in Nehbandan County